Ruth M. Kirk (February 2, 1930 – June 17, 2011) was an American politician who represented the 44th legislative district in the Maryland House of Delegates. She was elected 7 times and served a total of 28 years representing west and west central Baltimore.

Background
Born Ruth Simmons in Baltimore, Delegate Kirk was the fifth of eight children. She attended Baltimore City public schools through the ninth grade and later received a GED. Prior to being elected to The Maryland General Assembly, Kirk held jobs as a house cleaner and in early childhood education. In 1970, Kirk took a job at Paul Laurence Dunbar High School (Baltimore, Maryland), working as a teacher's aide.

In the Legislature
Kirk was first elected in 1982 and sworn in as a member of House of Delegates on January 12, 1983. She was appointed to the Constitutional and Administrative Law Committee and served on it until its elimination in 1990. She was then appointed to the Economic Matters Committee where she served until 2011. There, she served on its deathcare industry work group; workers' compensation subcommittee, 1995–2003; real estate & housing subcommittee, 1999–2003; business regulation subcommittee, 2003–11; property & casualty insurance subcommittee, 2003–06). During her career in the legislature, Kirk also served as a member of the  Tort and Insurance Reform Oversight Committee, 1993;  the House Facilities Committee, 1993–2011; the Joint Committee on Federal Relations, 1999–2004; the Protocol Committee, 2007–11, the Liaison Work Group of the Baltimore City Delegation, the Legislative Black Caucus of Maryland (formerly Maryland Black Caucus), 1983-2011 (member, nominating committee, 2000–11, redistricting committee, 2000–11; past chair, budget committee; past treasurer), the Women Legislators of Maryland, 1983-2011 (president, 1994); the Maryland Veterans Caucus, 2006–11, and the National Black Caucus of State Legislators. Outside of the legislature she was a member of the National Order of Women Legislators; and the Southern Legislative Conference (economic development, transportation & cultural affairs committee, 2005–11; fiscal affairs & government operations committee, 2005–11).

Legislative notes
 voted for the Clean Indoor Air Act of 2007 (HB359)
 voted for the Healthy Air Act in 2006 (SB154)
 voted for slots in 2005 (HB1361)
 voted for income tax reduction in 1998 (SB750)
 voted in favor of increasing the sales tax by 20% - Tax Reform Act of 2007(HB2)
 voted in favor of prohibiting ground rents in 2007(SB106)
 voted in favor of in-state tuition for illegal immigrants in 2007 (HB6)

Democratic primary election results, 2010
2010 Race for Maryland House of Delegates – 44th District
Voters to choose three: (only the top 6 finishers are shown)
{| class="wikitable"
|-
!Name
!Votes
!Percent
!Outcome
|-
|-
|Keith E. Haynes 
|4859
|  25.9%
|   Won
|-
|-
| Keiffer J. Mitchell, Jr.
|4481
|  13.9%
|   Won
|-
|-
|Melvin L. Stukes
|3321
|  17.7%
|   Won
|-
|-
| Ruth Kirk
|2860
|  15.2%
|   Lost
|-
|-
| Chris Blake
|973
|  5.1%
|   Lost
|-
|-
|Gary T. English  
|907 
|  4.8%
|   Lost
|-
|}

General election results, 2006
2006 Race for Maryland House of Delegates – 44th District
Voters to choose three:
{| class="wikitable"
|-
!Name
!Votes
!Percent
!Outcome
|-
|-
|Melvin L. Stukes Dem.
|13,173
|  34.0%
|   Won
|-
|-
|Ruth M. Kirk, Dem.
|12,894
|  33.3%
|   Won
|-
|-
|Keith E. Haynes, Dem.
|12,565
|  32.4%
|   Won
|-
|Other Write-Ins 
|129
|  0.3%
|   
|-
|}

Death and legacy

She died in 2011. Her son, Art Kirk, created a recreation center in her honor called the Ruth M. Kirk Recreation and Learning Center and Community Garden.

References 

Democratic Party members of the Maryland House of Delegates
African-American state legislators in Maryland
Politicians from Baltimore
1930 births
2011 deaths
Women state legislators in Maryland
African-American women in politics
21st-century American politicians
21st-century American women politicians
21st-century African-American women
21st-century African-American politicians
20th-century African-American people
20th-century African-American women